Robert P. Multhauf (1919–2004) was an American science historian, curator, director, scientific scholar and author. He served as president of the History of Science Society in the year 1979-80, and was awarded the Leonardo da Vinci Medal in 1987.

Biography

Early life
Multhauf was born in Sioux Falls, South Dakota, in 1919. He attended Iowa State University and received a Bachelor of Science degree in 1941. He later attended the University of California in Berkeley, and earned a Master of Arts degree in 1950, and a Ph.D in 1953. He did postdoctoral work at the Johns Hopkins University.

Further career
In 1954, the Smithsonian Institution hired Multhauf as an Associate Curator for the Division of Engineering, in the United States National Museum. He became the division's Curator in 1955, and was promoted to Head Curator of both the Division of Engineering and of Industries two years later, in 1957. That same year, he was appointed Head Curator of the Department of Science and Technology under the newly established Museum of History and Technology, for which he was also the Acting Curator of the Division of Physical Sciences.

Multhauf was an editor for the academic journal Isis, published by the University of Chicago Press, from 1964 to 1978. He became the Director of the Museum of History and Technology in 1966, and remained in this position for four years until he was replaced with Daniel Boorstin. From 1970 to 1977, he worked as the Senior Scientific Scholar of the Department of Science and Technology. He also worked for the Department of the History of Science from 1978 to 1979. He served as the president of the History of Science Society from 1979-80. When the museum was renamed again in 1980, as the National Museum of American History, he joined the Office of Senior Historians.

In 1985, Robert Multhauf received the Dexter Award for Outstanding Achievement in the History of Chemistry from the American Chemical Society.

Multhauf retired in 1987 and died in 2004.

Selected publications
 
 as compiler with the assistance of David Davies: 
 with Allen G. Debus: 
   
 as editor with Lloyd G. Stevenson: 
 
 
 with Gregory Good: 
 with John L. DuBois and Charles A. Ziegler:

References

External links
 
 

1919 births
2004 deaths
American historians of science
Iowa State University alumni
People from Sioux Falls, South Dakota
Leonardo da Vinci Medal recipients
University of California, Berkeley alumni
Johns Hopkins University alumni